Pelham High School is a high school in Pelham, Hillsborough County, New Hampshire, United States. It is part of School Administrative Unit (SAU) 28, and is administered by the Pelham School District. During the 2016–17 school year it had 655 students.

Athletics
Pelham High School is a NHIAA-governed school, and offers a three-season interscholastic athletic program for students to join. Additionally, Pelham High School has received numerous awards for athletic achievement, including a Mr. New Hampshire Basketball award in 2016, as well as a 2015-16 Gatorade New Hampshire Boys Basketball Player of the Year that same year.

Fall
 Boys' cross country
 Girls' cross country
 Field hockey
 Football
 Boys' soccer
 Girls' soccer
 Spirit team
 Volleyball

Winter
 Boys' basketball
 Girls' basketball
 Gymnastics (club)
 Ice hockey (club)
 Boys' indoor track
 Girls' indoor track
 Swim (club)
 Wrestling

Spring
 Baseball
 Boys' lacrosse
 Girls' lacrosse
 Softball
 Boys' tennis
 Girls' tennis
 Boys' track and field
 Girls' track and field

Clubs and activities
Pelham High School offers a wide array of clubs, activities, and honor societies for students to be involved in throughout the year. A club fair is held once a year in September to promote various clubs, and to persuade students to sign up. Honor societies are available to juniors and seniors only. The full list is as follows:
 Art Club
 Be the Change
 Creative Writing Club
 Drama Club
 Future Business Leaders of America
 Fellowship of Christian Athletes
 Gay / Straight Alliance
 Hiking Club
 LARP Club
 Math Honor Society
 Minecraft Club
 National Art Honor Society
 National English Honor Society
 National Honor Society
 National Science Honor Society
 Psychology Club
 Recycling Club
 Robotics Club
 Science Club
 Spanish National Honor Society
 Technology Honor Society
 Trivia Club

Demographics
The demographic breakdown of the 655 students enrolled for the 2016–2017 school year was:
 Male - 51.9%
 Female - 48.1%
 Native American/Alaskan - 0.2%
 Asian/Pacific Islander - 1.5%
 Black - 0.8%
 Hispanic - 1.4%
 White - 92.7%
 Multiracial - 3.5%

Notable alumni
Nick Groff, executive producer of Ghost Adventures TV series
Richard M. Linnehan, veterinarian, NASA astronaut

References

External links

Public high schools in New Hampshire
Schools in Hillsborough County, New Hampshire
Pelham, New Hampshire
Educational institutions established in 1974